Daniel Hotz (born 1967) is a Swiss orienteering competitor and World champion. He won a gold medal at the 1995 World Orienteering Championships in Detmold with the Swiss relay team (Alain Berger, Christian Aebersold and Urs Flühmann).

References

External links
 
 

1967 births
Living people
Swiss orienteers
Male orienteers
Foot orienteers
World Orienteering Championships medalists